Cleopatra is a 19th-century sculpture by American sculptor William Wetmore Story. Carved from marble, the sculpture depicts the Egyptian ruler Cleopatra. The sculpture is currently in the collection of the Metropolitan Museum of Art.

References 

Sculptures of the Metropolitan Museum of Art
Cultural depictions of Cleopatra